Luis Artemio Aldana Burgos (born 21 October 1962) is a Mexican politician from the National Action Party. From 2000 to 2003 he served as Deputy of the LVIII Legislature of the Mexican Congress representing Yucatán.

References

1962 births
Living people
Politicians from Yucatán (state)
People from Mérida, Yucatán
National Action Party (Mexico) politicians
21st-century Mexican politicians
Universidad Autónoma de Yucatán alumni
Academic staff of Universidad Autónoma de Yucatán
Deputies of the LVIII Legislature of Mexico
Members of the Chamber of Deputies (Mexico) for Yucatán